Philipp Strompf (born 23 April 1998) is a German professional footballer who plays as a defender for Eintracht Braunschweig.

Career
A youth player at Karlsruher SC, Strompf went to TSG 1899 Hoffenheim for three seasons via a season at FC Astoria Walldorf.

Strompf joined Eintracht Braunschweig in 2021 and impressed sufficiently to be given a new contract in the summer of 2022. Sporting director Peter Vollmann described him as “reliable” and a “team player” after he played 19 games and scored 2 goals in the 2021–22 season that earned Braunschweig promotion to the 2. Bundesliga. Strompf made his 2. Bundesliga debut on 17 July 2022 in a 2–0 defeat to Hamburger SV.

References

External links
 

Living people
1998 births
People from Neckar-Odenwald-Kreis
German footballers
Footballers from Baden-Württemberg
Association football defenders
2. Bundesliga players
3. Liga players
Regionalliga players
Oberliga (football) players
FC Astoria Walldorf players
TSG 1899 Hoffenheim II players
Eintracht Braunschweig players